Malagoli is an Italian surname. Notable people with the surname include:

 Giovanni Malagoli (1856–1926), Italian painter
 Marcello Malagoli (born 1973), Italian baseball player

Italian-language surnames